Hockworthy is a village and civil parish in Devon, England. Its name is Old English and means "Hocca's enclosure". It has a church dedicated to St. Simon and St. Jude which was mostly rebuilt in 1865, and contains a Norman font.

References

Villages in Mid Devon District